Lophostemon confertus (syn. Tristania conferta), is an evergreen tree native to Australia, though it is cultivated in the United States and elsewhere. Common names include brush box, Queensland box, Brisbane box, pink box, box scrub, and  vinegartree. Its natural range in Australia is north-east New South Wales and coastal Queensland but it is commonly used as a street tree in Sydney, Melbourne, Perth and other cities in eastern Australia.

Description
In the wild its habitat ranges from moist open forest and rainforest ecotones, where it might reach heights of 40 metres or more, to coastal headlands where it acquires a stunted, wind-sheared habit. Dome-like in shape, it has a denser foliage with dark green, leathery leaves and hence provides more shade than eucalyptus trees. Moreover, it is considered safer than eucalypts because it rarely sheds limbs.

Habitat
It is considered useful as a street tree, due to its disease and pest resilience, its high tolerance for smog, drought and poor drainage, and the fact that it needs only moderate-to-light upkeep.  It often requires lopping to accommodate overhead power lines, but survives pruning quite well. In form it is used as a replacement for the weedy Camphor Laurel (Cinnamomum camphora) while having a low potential for being weedy itself. The tree is one of the hardiest and most successful street trees within wider Sydney and elsewhere. One of the best examples is the garden suburb of Haberfield in Sydney where the streets are planted almost entirely with the tree. When the land was subdivided in 1901 the trees were planted in the road reserve creating a regular pattern and well shaded streets.

Taxonomy
The species was formally described in 1812 by Scottish botanist Robert Brown, based on plant material collected from the Hunter River region in New South Wales.  Brown named the species Tristania confertia. The species was transferred to the genus Lophostemon in 1982.

Gallery

References

Myrtaceae
Myrtales of Australia
Flora of Queensland
Trees of Australia
Ornamental trees